The 2014–15 West Virginia Mountaineers men's basketball team represented West Virginia University during the 2014–15 NCAA Division I men's basketball season. The Mountaineers were coached by eighth year head coach Bob Huggins and played their home games at WVU Coliseum. They were members of the Big 12 Conference. They finished the season 25–10, 11–7 in Big 12 play to finish in a tie for fourth place. They lost in the quarterfinals of the Big 12 tournament to Baylor. They received an at-large bid to the NCAA tournament where they defeated Buffalo in the second round and Maryland in the third round before losing in the Sweet Sixteen to Kentucky.

Previous season
The Mountaineers finished the season 17–16, 9–9 in Big 12 play to finish in a tie for sixth place. They lost in the quarterfinals of the Big 12 tournament to Texas. They were invited to the National Invitation Tournament where they lost in the first round Georgetown.

Departures

Incoming transfers

Recruits

Roster

Schedule and results
Sources:  and 

|-
!colspan=9 style="background:#FFC600; color:#003366;"| Exhibition

|-
!colspan=9 style="background:#FFC600; color:#003366;"| Non-conference games

|-
!colspan=9 style="background:#FFC600; color:#003366;"| Conference games

|-
!colspan=9 style="background:#FFC600; color:#003366;"| Big 12 Tournament

|-
!colspan=9 style="background:#FFC600; color:#003366;"| NCAA tournament

Rankings

See also
 2014–15 West Virginia Mountaineers women's basketball team

References

West Virginia
West Virginia Mountaineers men's basketball seasons
West Virginia
2014 in sports in West Virginia
2015 in sports in West Virginia